Numerous economically or medically significant organic compounds are  salts.

These include:
 Formates
 Acetates
 Butyrates
 Benzoates
 Carboxylates
 Alkoxides
 Phenolates
 Oxalates
 Malonates
 Tartrates
 Malates
 Citrates
 Gluconates
 Maleates
 Sorbates
 Stearates
 Lactates
 Glycerates
 Urates
 Diazonium salts
 Iminium salts
 Phosphinates
 Organophosphates
 Mesylates
 Bechgaard salts
 Picolinates
 Salts of cocaine
 Salts of morphine
 Monosodium glutamate
 Trolamine salicylate
 Triphenylmethyl hexafluorophosphate
 Choline chloride
 Copper ibuprofenate
 Homatropine methylbromide
 Mellite
 Tetrapropylammonium perruthenate
 Collidinium p-toluenesulfonate
 Pyridinium chloride
 Tetrasodium EDTA
 Lithium diisopropylamide
 Lithium bis(trimethylsilyl)amide
 Potassium trispyrazolylborate

See also 

 List of copper salts
 List of inorganic compounds

Organic compounds
Salts